Around the 5th week, the intermaxillary segment arises as a result of fusion of the two medial nasal processes and the frontonasal process within the embryo. The intermaxillary segment gives rise to the primary palate. The primary palate will form the premaxillary portion of the maxilla (anterior one-third of the final palate). This small portion is anterior to the incisive foramen and will contain the maxillary incisors.

References

Embryology